The following is a list of squads for each nation competing in Brazil Independence Cup in 1972.

Argentina
Head coach:  Juan José Pizzuti

                                                                                                                                                                                                                                  
(N°2) Miguel Angel Lopez DF 01/03/1942 Club Atletico River Plate (Argentina)                                                                                                                                                                                                                                         (N°16)Roberto Saverio Volpi MF 10/06/1950 Newell´s Old Boys Rosario Provincia de Santa Fe (Argentina)
Uncalled players:(N°17)Miguel Angel Tojo MF 09/07/1943 Club Atletico San Lorenzo de Almagro (Argentina)                                                                                                                             (N°22)Roberto Arturo Gramajo MF 28/07/1943 Club Atletico Rosario Central (Argentina)                                                                                                                                     
(N°23)Ruben Omar Sanchez GK 29/07/1945 Club Atletico Boca Juniors (Argentina)
During the tournament the player Rodolfo Jose Fischer FW (N°15) 02/04/1944 was transferred of the Athletic Club San Lorenzo de Almagro to Botafogo de Futebol e Regatas from Brazil.

Africa
Head coaches:  Cheikh Kouyate and  Anani Matthia
Ibrahima Sory Keita (Guinea) (FW) Haifa FC (Guinea) 30/11/1944
Maxime Camara (Guinea) (MF) Haifa FC (Guinea) 04/02/1943
Louis Gomis Diop (Senegal) (MF) ASC Diaraf (Senegal) / /19
Edouard Gnacadja (Senegal) (DF) FC Lorient (France) / /19
Sadok Sassi Attouga (Tunisia) (GK) Club Africain (Tunisia) 15/11/1945
Miloud Hadefi (Algeria) (DF) WA Tiemcen (Algeria) 12/03/1949
Tahar Ben Ferhat (Algeria) (DF) MC Oran (Algeria) / /19
John Eshun (Ghana) (DF) Sekondi Hasaacas (Ghana) 17/07/1942
Sam Edward Acquah (Ghana) (DF) Accra Hearts Of Oak (Ghana) 23/07/1935
Malik Jabir (Ghana) (FW) Assante Kotoko (Ghana) 08/12/1944
Jean-Pierre Tokoto (Cameroon) (FW) Olympique De Marseiile (France) 26/01/1948
Hassan Shehata (Egypt) (DF) Zemalek SC (Egypt) 19/06/1949
Moustafa Hany (Egypt) (DF) Al-Masry SC(Egypt) / /19
Laurent N´Dri Pokou (Ivory Coast) (FW) ASEC Mimosas (Ivory Coast) 10/08/1947
Noël Birindi Minga (Congo) (MF) AC Leopards (Congo) / /19
François M'Pelé (Congo) (FW) AC Ajaccio (France) 13/07/1947
Tommy Sylvestre (Togo) (GK) Etolile Filante (Togo) 31/08/1946
Uncalled Players:*18 GK Congo Maxime Matsima 18/01/1940 Diables Noirs Brazzaville (Congo)
19 FW Morocco Ahmed Faras  07/12/1946 Chabas Mohammedia (Morocco)
20 MF Nigeria Haruna Hilerika 27/10/1949 Stationery Stores (Nigeria)
21 MF Sudan Ahmed Bushara Wahba 01/01/1943 Al-Merreikh (Sudan)
22 MF Zaire Leonard Saidi 24/11/1941 TP Mazembe (Zaire)
23 MF/FW Morocco Mohamed El Filali 09/07/1945 MC Oujda (Morocco)

Bolivia
Head coach:  Rubén Saldaña Barba

Carlos Conrado Jimenez (GK) 10/02/1948 Club Deportivo Chaco Petrolero (Bolivia)
Edwin Frey Barba (GK) 26/09/1943  
Tito Saavedra (GK) / / 19 Club Deportivo Oriente Petrolero (Bolivia)
Luis Hernan Cayo Thames (DF) 19/08/1946 Futbol Club Bolivar (Bolivia)
Jorge Moreno (DF) / / 19 Club Deportivo Oriente Petrolero (Bolivia)
Jaime Olivera (DF) / / Jorge Wilstermann (Bolivia)
Felix Chavez (DF) / /1948 Club Deportivo Chaco Petrolero (Bolviia)
Armando Rivera  / /19
Celin Garrido  / /19
Bernardino Vargas (DF) /  /19
Miguel Angel Antelo (DF) 26/01/1950 Club Deportivo Oriente Petrolero (Bolivia)
Nemesio Leaños (MF) 27/12/1949 Club Deportivo Oriente Petrolero
Ramiro Blacut Rodriguez (FW) 03/01/1944 Futbol Club Melgar (Peru)
David Vaca  /  /19
Porfirio Jimenez Hurtado (MF) 16//02/1952 Club Social y Deportivo Guabira (Bolivia)
Arturo Saucedo Landa (FW) 04/07/1951 Club Deportivo Oriente Petrolero (Bolivia)
Jaime Alberto Morales  / /19
Gerson Balcazar (MF)  / / 19 Club Deportivo Litoral de Cochabamba
Nicolas Linares Salbury (MF) 06/12/1945 Deportivo Municipal (Bolivia)
Hugo Perez (MF) Jorge Wilstermann (Bolivia)  / /19
Juan Jose Jimenez (FW) The Strongest (Bolivia)  / /19
Raul Alberto Morales (MF) 04/06/1951 Club Bolivar (Bolivia)
Ovidio Messa Soruco (MF) 12/12/1952 Club Deportivo Chaco Petrolero (Bolivia)
Jose Gonzalez /  /19
Jose Campos  / /19
Mario Pariente (MF) / /19  The Strongest (Bolivia)
Jaime Rimazza Vargas (MF) 12/12/1946 Deportivo Municipal (Bolivia)
Victor Barrientos Gonzales (FW) 08/05/1952 The Strongest (Bolivia)

Brazil
Head coach:  Mário Zagallo

 N° 1     Emerson Leao (GK) S.E. Palmeiras (Brazil) 07/11/1949
 N° 2     Ze Maria (DF)  S.C. Corinthians (Brazil) 18/05/1949
 N° 3     Brito (DF) S.C. Recife (Brazil) 09/08/1939
 N° 4     Vantuir Galdino Gomes (DF) Atletico Mineiro (Brazil) 16/11/1949
 N° 6     Marco Antônio Feliciano (DF) Fluminense FC (Brazil) 06/02/1951
 N° 13    Jose Rodríguez Neto (DF) C. R.Flamengo (Brazil) 06/12/1949
 N° 5     Clodoaldo (MF) Santos FC (Brazil) 25/09/1949
 N° 8     Gérson (MF) São Paulo FC (Brazil) 11/01/1941
 N° 21    Caju (FW) Botafogo FR (Brazil) 16/06/1949
 N° 17    Leivinha (FW) SE Palmeiras (Brazil) 11/09/1949
 N° 7     Jairzinho (FW)Botafogo FR (Brazil) 25/12/1944
 N° 9     Darío Jose dos Santos (FW) Atletico Mineiro (Brazil) 04/03/1946
 N° 10    Rivelino (MF) S.C. Corinthians (Brazil) 01/01/1946
 N° 15    Tostão (FW) Vasco Da Gama (Brazil) 25/01/1947 
 N° 12    Sergio Valentim (GK) São Paulo FC (Brazil) 22/05/1949
 N° 18    Eurico (DF) S.E. Palmeiras (Brazil) 03/02/1948
 N° 19    Marinho Peres (DF) Santos FC (Brazil) 19/03/1947
 N° 16    Luiz Carlos Gualter (DF) S.C. Corinthians (Brazil) 17/10/1947
 N° 14    Wilson da Silva Piazza (MF) Cruzeiro E.C.(Brazil) 25/02/1943
 N° 11    Luis Roberto Pinto Neto (FW) Fluminense FC (Brazil) 16/11/1946
 N° 20    Rogerio Hetmanek (FW) C.R. Flamengo (Brazil) 02/08/1948
 N° 21    Dirceu Lopes Mendes (MF) Coritiba FC (Brazil) 03/09/1946
 N° 22   Felix (GK) 24/12/1937 Fluminense FC (Brazil)
 N° 23   Vaguinho (Wagno de Freitas) (FW) 11/02/1950 Sporte Clube Corinthians (Brazil)

Chile
Head coach:  Rudi Gutendorf

Adolfo Nef Sanhueza (GK) Universidad de Chile (Chile) 18/01/1946
Manuel Jesus Gaete Collao (MF) Union San Felipe (Chile) 05/01/1948
Julio Alberto Crisosto Zarate (FW) Universidad Catolica (Chile) 21/03/1950
Leonardo Ivan Véliz Diaz (FW) Colo Colo (Chile) 03/09/1945
Carlos Humberto Caszely Garrido (FW) Colo Colo (Chile) 05/07/1950
Alberto Jorge Fouilloux Ahumada (MF) Union Española (Chile) 22/11/1940
Francisco Valdés Muñoz (MF) Colo Colo (Chile) 19/03/1943
Eduardo Hector Peralta Castillo (MF) Universidad de Chile (Chile) 18/04/1947
Alfonso Osvaldo Lara Madrid (MF) Lota Schwager (Chile) 27/04/1946
Raúl Eduardo Angulo Muñoz (DF) Union Española (Chile) 29/11/1937
Juan Salvador Machuca Valdes (MF) Union Española (Chile) 03/07/1951
Guillermo Segundo Azócar Caris (DF) Club Deportivo Huachipato (Chile) 19/06/1946
Antonio Arias Mujica(DF) Union Española (Chile) 09/10/1944
Leopoldo Vallejos (GK) Union Española (Chile) 16/01/1944
Patricio Peralta (MF) / /19
Ruben Fernando Carvallo Muñoz (MF) Union San Felipe (Chile) 24/09/1948
Rogelio Farias Salvador (MF) Union Española (Chile) 13/08/1949
Fernando Ernesto Espinosa Moreira (FW) Club Deportivo Magallanes (Chile) 01/02/1949
Francisco Jose Las Heras Risso (MF) Universidad de Chile (Chile) 21/08/1949
Hugo Nelson Berly Rivas (DF) Union Española (Chile) 31/12/1941
Francisco Segundo Pinochet Cifuentes (DF) 15/12/1947 Deportes Concepcion (Chile)
Luis Perez (DF) / /19
Gustavo Laube 09/04/1944 (DF) Club Deportivo Magallanes (Chile)
Daniel Orlando Diaz Muñoz (MF) Club Deportivo Huachipato (Chile) 07/08/1948 
Juan Antonio Arias Mujica (DF) Union Española (Chile) 09/10/1944 
Sergio Alberto Ramirez Maulen (MF) Club Deportivo Huachipato (Chile) 12/09/1943

Colombia
Head coach:  Todor Veselinović

Pedro Antonio Zape (GK) Deportivo Cali (Colombia) 03/06/1949
Alfonso Cañón Rincon (MF) Independiente Santa Fe (Colombia) 20/04/1946
Jose Silvio Quintero (GK) Deportes Tolima (Colombia) 13/04/1950
Gerardo Moncada (DF) Atletico Nacional (Colombia) 27/05/1949
Jesús Maria Rubio Hernandez (DF) Millonarios Futbol Club (Colombia) 29/03/1945
Óscar López Vazquez (DF)  Deportivo Cali (Colombia) 02/04/1939
Jaime Rodríguez Suarez (DF) Independiente Santa Fe (Colombia) 16/12/1947
Óscar Ortega (DF) Millonarios Futbol Club (Colombia) 05/11/1950
Álvaro Calle (DF) Independiente Medellin (Colombia) 25/05/1953
 Gabriel Alonso Hernández (DF) Millonarios Futbol Club (Colombia) 01/01/1942
Victor Campaz Rengifo (FW) Independiente Santa Fe (Colombia) 21/05/1949
Fabio Espinosa (MF) Deportes Tolima (Colombia) 13/06/1948
Luis Augusto García Barragan (FW) Independiente Santa Fe (Colombia) 15/07/1950
Adolfo Andrade  (MF) Deportivo Cali (Colombia) 05/01/1950
Alejandro Brand (MF) Millonarios Futbol Club (Colombia) 15/05/1950
Álvaro Contreras (MF) Deportivo Cali (Colombia) / 19
Jaime Morón (FW) Millonarios Futbol Club (Colombia) 16/11/1950
Carlos Alberto Lugo (FW) Deportes Tolima (Colombia) 01/09/1953
Orlando Mesa (MF) Deportivo Cali (Colombia) 04/12//1947
Edgar Angulo (FW) Atletico Nacional (Colombia) 02/03/1953
Hernando Piñeros (FW) Atletico Nacional (Colombia) 14/10/1943
Victor Cañon (GK) Atletico Nacional (Colombia) / /19
Oscar Lopez Vazquez (DF) 02/04/1939 Deportivo Cali (Colombia)

CONCACAF
Head coaches:  Antoine Tassy (Haiti) and  Carlos Padilla Velasquez (Honduras)

Óscar Rolando Hernández Maradiaga (Honduras) (FW) Club Deportivo Motagua (Honduras) 10/06/1950
Jorge Urquía Elvir (Honduras) (FW) Club Deportivo Olimpia (Honduras) 19/06/1946
Jose Fernando Bulnes Zelaya (Honduras) (DF) Club Deportivo Olimpia (Honduras) 21/10/1946
Selvyn Carcano (Honduras) (MF) Club Deportivo Olimpia (Honduras) / /19
Jose Luis Cruz (Honduras) (DF) Club Deportivo Motagua (Honduras) 12/06/1949
Ramón Cruz Colindres (Honduras) (MF) Real España (Honduras) / /19
Ángel Ramón Paz (Honduras) (MF) Club Deportivo Olimpia (Honduras) 28/10/1950
Miguel Ángel Matamoros (Honduras) (DF) Club Deportivo Olimpia (Honduras) 10/05/1949
Henry Francillon (Haiti) (GK) Victory SC (Haiti) 26/05/1946
Wilner Nazaire (Haiti) (DF) Racing Club Haitien (Haiti) 30/05/1950
Philippe Vorbe (Haiti) (MF) Zenith FC (Haiti) 14/09/1947
Jean-Claude Roosvelt Désir (Haiti) (MF) Aigle Noir (Haiti) 08/08/1946
Claude Barthélémy (Haiti) (FW) Racing Club Haitien (Haiti) 09/05/1945
Emmanuel Sanon (Haiti) (FW) Don Bosco FC (Haiti) 25/06/1951
Guy François (Haiti) (MF) Violette AC (Haiti) 18/09/1947
Wenall Trott (Bermudas) (MF) Robin Hood FC (Bermudas) / /19
Noel Simmons (Bermudas) (DF) PHC Zebras (Bermudas) / /19
Edwin Renier Schal (Surinam) (FW) SV Transvaal (Surinam) 04/10/1944
Vester Constantine (Jamaica) (GK) Harbour View FC (Jamaica) / /19
Mario Velarde Velazquez (Mexico) (MF) Club Universidad Nacional A.C. (Mexico) 29/03/1940
Gerald Figueroux (Trinidad and Tobago) (GK) Culture United (Trinidad y Tobago) 23/05/1943
Manuel Cuadra Serrano (Nicaragua) (FW) Flor de Caña FC (Nicaragua) 25/08/1947
Miguel Angel Matamoros Morales (DF) Club Deportivo Olimpia (Honduras) 10/05/1949
Francisco Flores (MF) (Mexico) / /19

Czechoslovakia
Head coach:  Václav Ježek

Ecuador
Head coach:  Jorge Enrique Lazo Logroño

Carlos Omar Delgado (GK) Club Sport Emelec (Ecuador) 07/02/1949
Fernando Gilberto Maldonado (GK) El Nacional (Ecuador) 12/01/1945
Adolfo Bolaños (GK) LDU Quito (Ecuador) 24/09/1938
Rafael Guerrero (DF) Club Sport Emelec (Ecuador) 28/12/1950
Carlos Germano Campoverde (DF) El Nacional (Ecuador)  / /19
Jesus Emilio Ortiz (DF) Club Sport Emelec (Ecuador) 25/12/1947
Victor Hugo Pelaez (DF) Barcelona SC (Ecuador) 12/02/1947
Jefferson Donald Camacho (DF) Club Sport Emelec (Ecuador) 18/05/1949
Miguel Angel Coronel (MF) Barcelona SC (Ecuador) 30/09/1952
Jorge Bolaños (MF) Barcelona SC (Ecuador) 26/06/1944
Carlos Torres Garces (MF) El Nacional (Ecuador) 15/08/1951
Luis Estevan Escalante Grim (MF) El Nacional (Ecuador) 19/01/1945
Juan Raul Noriega (MF) Barcelona SC (Ecuador) 02/02/1943
Walter Cardenas (MF) Barcelona SC (Ecuador) 17/02/1944
Felix Lasso Garcia (FW) Club Sport Emelec (Ecuador) 28/05/1945
Raul Patricio Penaherrera (FW) El Nacional (Ecuador) 15/03/1946
Italo Eugenio Estupiñan Martinez (FW) Club Social y Deportivo Macara (Ecuador) 01/01/1952
Hector Anibal Morales (FW) Club Social y Deportivo Macara (Ecuador) 15/07/1944
Marco Antonio Guime (FW) Club Sport Emelec (Ecuador) 25/04/1949
Romulo Dudar Mina (FW) Club Social y Deportivo Macara (Ecuador) 05/04/1949
Alberto Pedro Spencer (FW) Barcelona SC (Ecuador) 06/12/1937
Luis Cristobal Mantilla (MF) Universidad Catolica (Ecuador) 28/11/1949

France
Head coach:  Georges Boulogne

Louis Floch (FW) AS Monaco (France) 28/12/1947 
Georges Lech (FW) FC Sochaux (France) 02/06/1945
Dominique Baratelli (GK) OGC Nice (France) 26/12/1947
Claude Quittet (DF) OGC Nice (France) 12/03/1941
Jean Djorkaeff (DF) Paris Saint Germain (France) 27/10/1939
Jean-Paul Rostagni (DF) Paris Saint Geirmain (France) 14/01/1948
Marius Trésor (DF) Olympique de Marseille (France) 15/01/1950
Georges Bereta (DF) Association Sportive Saint Ettienne Loire (France) 15/05/1946
Henri Michel (MF) Football Club de Nantes (France) 28/10/1947
Jean-Michel Larqué (MF) Association Sportive Saint Ettienne Loire (France) 08/09/1947
Michel Mézy (MF) Nîmes Olympique (France) 15/08/1948
Bernard Blanchet (FW) Football Club de Nantes (France) 01/12/1943
Hervé Revelli (FW) OGC Nice (France) 05/06/1946
Georges Carnus (GK) Olympique de Marseille (France) 13/08/1942
Jean Francois Jodar (DF) Stade de Reims (France) 02/12/1949
Jean Pierre Adams (DF) Nîmes Olympique (France) 10/03/1948
Charly Loubet (FW) OGC Nice (France) 26/01/1946
Marc Molitor (FW) Racing Club de Strasbourg Alsace (France) 21/09/1948

Iran
Head coach:  Mohammad Ranjbar

Akbar Kargarjam (DF) Esteghal Tehran (Iran) 26/12/1947
Ali Parvin (MF) Persepolis FC (Iran) 12/10/1947
Alireza Hajghasem (FW) Taj Tehran (Iran) 19/03/1943
Ebrahim Ashtiani (DF) Persepolis FC (Iran) 04/01/1952
Gholam Hossein Mazloumi (FW) Esteghal Tehran (Iran) 13/01/1950
Hossein Kalani (FW) Persepolis FC (Iran) 23/01/1945
Javad Ghorab (MF) Esteghal Tehran (Iran) 30/07/1949
Karo Haghverdian (MF) Esteghal Tehran (Iran) 11/01/1945
Nasser Hejazi (GK) Esteghal Tehran (Iran) 19/12/1949
Jafar Kashani (DF) Persepolis FC (Iran) 21/03/1944
Mostafa Arab (DF) Oghab FC (Iran) 31/12/1942
Parviz Ghelichkhani (MF) Pas Tehran (Iran)  04/09/1945
Safar Iranpak (FW) Persepolis FC (Iran) 23/12/1947
Majid Halvaei (DF) Pas Tehran (Iran) 07/02/1948
Mehdi Monajati (DF) Pas Tehran (Iran) 29/06/1952
Mohammad Sadeghi (MF) Pas Tehran (Iran) 16/03/1952

Republic of Ireland
Head coach:  Liam Tuohy

Paraguay
Head coach:  Aurelio González

Jorge Adalberto Escobar (FW) Cerro Porteño (Paraguay) 23/04/1949
Alcides Báez (GK) Cerro Porteño (Paraguay) 17/01/1947
Alcides Sosa Ovelar (DF) Olimpia (Paraguay) 24/03/1944
Américo Godoy (MF) Olimpia (Paraguay) 13/10/1944
Carlos de los Santos Jara Saguier (MF) Cerro Porteño (Paraguay) 01/11/1950
Crispín Garcia Maciel (FW) Sol de America (Paraguay) 14/02/1951
Cristóbal Wilfrido Maldonado (MF) Libertad (Paraguay) 12/10/1950
Emigdio dos Santos (MF) Libertad (Paraguay)  / /19 
Evelio Villalba (DF) Olimpia (Paraguay) /  /19
Lorenzo Espinoza (MF) Club Nacional (Paraguay) / /19
Lorenzo Jiménez Roa (FW) Olimpia (Paraguay) 10/08/1944
Luis César Ortiz Aquino (DF) Cerro Porteño (Paraguay) 25/08/1949
Pedro Molinas (DF) Olimpia (Paraguay) 01/08/1942
Rufino León Diaz (DF) River Plate (Paraguay) 11/08/1952
Saturnino Arrúa Molinas (FW) Cerro Porteño (Paraguay) 07/04/1949
Jose de la Cruz Benitez (GK) Olimpia (Paraguay) 03/05/1952
Julian Morales (DF) Club Nacional (Paraguay) /  /19
Valentin Mendoza (DF) Cerro Porteño (Paraguay) 14/02/1945
Luis Leguizamon (DF) Club Guarani (Paraguay)  / /19
Pedro Alcides Bareiro Molinas (MF) Cerro Porteño (Paraguay) 18/01/1951
Carlos Martinez Diarte (MF) Olimpia (Paraguay) 26/01/1954
Ramon Tito Correa Meza (MF) Olimpia (Paraguay) 30/04/1951
Crispin Rafael Verza Vargas (FW) Olimpia (Paraguay) 24/10/1952
Jorge Pantaleon Insfran Torres (FW) Olimpia (Paraguay) 27/07/1950
Francisco Riveros (FW) Cerro Porteño (Paraguay) 11/07/1946
Carlos Baez Vargas (FW) Rubio Ñu (Paraguay) 01/11/1953

Peru
Head coach:  Roberto Scarone

Felix Alberto Gallardo Mendoza (FW) Sporting Cristal (Peru) 28/11/1940
César Augusto Cueto Villa (MF) Jose Galvez FC (Peru) 16/06/1952
Angel Eloy Campos (DF) Sporting Cristal (Peru) 31/05/1942
Fernando Cuéllar Avalos (DF) Universitario de Deportes (Peru) 27/08/1945
Héctor Alberto Bailetti Cordova (FW) Universitario de Deportes (Peru) 27/11/1945
Hernán Angel Castañeda Montalvo (MF) Universitario de Deportes (Peru) 05/08/1945
Hugo Alejandro Sotil Yeren (FW) Deportivo Municipal (Peru) 08/03/1949
José Manuel Velásquez Castillo (MF) Alianza Lima (Peru) 04/06/1951
Julio Luna Portal (DF) Universitario de Deportes (Peru) / /19
Luis Rubiños Cerda (GK) Sporting Cristal (Peru) 31/12/1940
Manuel Mayorga (MF) Alianza Lima (Peru) 02/01/1943 
Orlando Luis de la Torre Castro (DF) Sporting Cristal (Peru) 21/11/1943                                                                                                                                                                                  
Percy Rojas Montero (FW) Universitario de Deportes (Peru) 16/09/1949
Ramón Antonio Mifflin Paez (MF) Sporting Cristal (Peru) 05/04/1947
Alberto Garrido (DF) Jose Galvez Futbol Club (Peru) / /19
Alfredo Enrique Quesada Farias (MF) Sporting Cristal (Peru) 22/09/1949
Eleazar Jose Manuel Alejandro Soria Ibarra (DF) Universitario de Deportes (Peru) 11/01/1948
Héctor Eduardo Moises Chúmpitaz Gonzales (DF) Universitario de Deportes (Peru) 12/04/1943
Jesús Goyzueta Cardenas (GK) Universitario de Deportes (Peru) 08/03/1947
Juan José Muñante Lopez (FW) Universitario de Deportes (Peru) 04/06/1948
Manuel Uribe (GK) Atletico Deportivo Olimpico Callao (Peru) 14/10/1940
Percy Vílchez Pantoja (FW) Universitario de Deportes (Peru) 15/12/1953
Teófilo Juan Cubillas Arizaga (MF) Alianza Lima (Peru) 08/03/1949
Víctor Fernández (FW) Club Sportivo Cienciano (Peru) / /19
Oswaldo Felipe Ramirez Salcedo (FW) Universitario de Deportes (Peru) 29/03/1947

Portugal
Head coach:  José Augusto de Almeida
Adolfo Calisto Sport Lisboa e Benfica (Portugal)(DF) 01/01/1944
Toni Sport Lisboa e Benfica (Portugal) (MF) 14/10/1946
Artur Correia Sport Lisboa e Benfica (Portugal)(DF) 18/04/1950
Artur Jorge Sport Lisboa e Benfica (Portugal)  (FW) 13/02/1946
Augusto Matine Sport Lisboa e Benfica (DF) (Portugal) 13/12/1947
Eusébio Sport Lisboa e Benfica (FW) (Portugal) 25/01/1942
Fernando Peres Sporting Clube de Portugal (Portugal) (MF) 08/01/1942
Humberto Coelho Sport Lisboa e Benfica (Portugal) (DF) 20/04/1950
Jaime Graça Sport Lisboa e Benfica (Portugal) (MF) 30/01/1942
João Laranjeira Sporting Clube de Portugal (Portugal) (DF) 28/09/1951
Joaquim Dinis Sporting Clube de Portugal (Portugal) (FW) 01/12/1947
José Henrique Sport Lisboa e Benfica (Portugal (GK) 18/05/1943
Nené Sport Lisboa e Benfica (Portugal) (FW) 20/11/1949
Rui Jordão Sport Lisboa e Benfica (Portugal) (FW) 09/08/1952
Félix Mourinho Os Belenenses Futebol SAD (Portugal) (GK) 12/02/1938
Vítor Damas Sporting Clube de Portugal (Portugal) (GK) 08/10/1947
Messias Timula Sport Lisboa e Benfica (Portugal) (DF)/(MF) 18/02/1948
Alfredo Murça Futbol Club Porto (Portugal) (DF) 17/01/1948
Abel Miglieti Futbol Club Porto (Portugal)(FW) 04/03/1946
Francisco Faria Sporting Clube de Portugal (Portugal) (FW) 09/10/1949

Scotland
Head coach:  Tommy Docherty

 Ally Hunter (GK) Klimarnock FC (Scotland) 04/10/1949
 Robert Clark (GK) Aberdeen FC (Scotland) 26/09/1945
 John Angus MacDonald Hansen (DF) Partick Thistle FC 03/02/1950
 Alex Forsyth (DF) Partick Thistle FC 05/02/1952
 Eddie Colquhoun (DF) Sheffield United FC (England) 29/03/1945
 Martin McLean Buchan (DF) Manchester United FC (England) 06/03/1949
 Willie Donachie (DF) Manchester City FC (England) 05/10/1951
 William John Bremner (MF) Leeds United FC (England) 09/12/1942
 Richard Hartford (MF) West Bromwich Albion FC (England) 24/10/1950
 George Graham (FW) Arsenal FC (England) 30/11/1944
 Jimmy Bone (FW) Partick Thistle FC 22/09/1949 
 William Morgan (FW) Manchester United FC (England) 02/10/1944
 Denis Law (FW) Manchester United FC (England) 24/02/1940
 Lou Macari (MF) Celtic FC (Scotland) 04/06/1949
 Colin Stein (FW) The Rangers Football Club Limited (Scotland) 10/05/1947

Soviet Union
Head coach:  Aleksandr Ponomarev

Uruguay
Head coach:  Washington Etchamendi

 Luis Alberto Aguerre Britos (GK) 27/09/1946 Huracan Buceo (Uruguay)
 Hugo Lorenzo Carrabs Finno (GK) 15/10/1954 Danubio Futbol Club (Uruguay)
 Alberto Enrique Carrasco (GK) 22/09/1945 Sud America (Uruguay)
 Baudilio Jáuregui (DF) 09/09/1945 River Plate (Argentina)
 Francisco Campo (DF) / /19 Liverpool Montevideo (Uruguay)
 Juan Pedro Ascery (DF) 16/10/1950 Danubio Futbol Club (Uruguay)
 Juan Carlos Masnik Hornos (DF) 02/03/1943 Nacional (Uruguay)
 Juan Blanco 25/02/1946 (DF) Nacional (Uruguay)
 Mario González (DF) 27/09/1950 Peñarol (Uruguay)
 Agapito Rivero (DF) Liverpool Montevideo (Uruguay) 24/03/1945
 Julio Walter Montero Castillo (DF)/(MF) Nacional (Uruguay) 25/04/1944
 Alberto Victor Cardaccio (MF) Danubio Futbol Club (Uruguay) 26/08/1949
 Ildo Enrique Maneiro Ghezzi (MF) Nacional (Uruguay) 04/08/1947
 Víctor Rodolfo Espárrago (MF) Nacional (Uruguay) 06/10/1944
 Luis Humberto Montero Pedreira (MF) Bella Vista Montevideo (Uruguay) 18/03/1948
 Julio César Giménez Tejito (MF) Peñarol (Uruguay) 27/08/1954
 Luis Villalba (FW) Peñarol (Uruguay) /  /19
 Ruben Romeo Corbo (FW) Peñarol (Uruguay) 20/01/1952
 Ángel de Assis Ferreira Rodriguez (FW) Atlas Guadalajara (Mexico) 09/03/1950
 Fernando Morena Belora (FW) River Plate (Uruguay) 02/02/1952
 Pierino Alberto Lattuada Sosa (MF)/(FW) Liverpool Montevideo (Uruguay) 16/04/1950
 Ricardo Elvio Pavoni (DF) Club Atletico Independiente (Argentina) 08/07/1943
 Ignacio Luis Ubiña 07/06/1940 (DF)Nacional (Uruguay)
 Francisco Bertocchi 05/08/1946 (MF) Liverpool Montevideo (Uruguay)

Venezuela
Head coach:  Gregorio Gómez

N° 1   Víto Fassano (GK) Deportivo Italia (Venezuela) 11/02/1940
N° 12  Omar Enrique Colmenares Ortiz (GK) Valencia FC (Venezuela) 02/04/1944
N° 21  Eddy García (GK) Deportivo Galicia (Venezuela) 03/02/1946
N° 2   Raúl Jorge Stanich Marusich (Argentina) (DF) Valencia FC (Venezuela) 27/08/1942
N° 15  Ricardo Pérez Carbonell (MF) Deportivo Galicia (Venezuela) 12/01/1950
N° 3   Orlando Torres Marín (DF) Deportivo Italia (Venezuela) 23/09/1942
N° 6   Vicente Arruda (DF)(Brazil) Deportivo Italia (Venezuela)27/08/1941
N° 5   Luis Alfredo Mendoza Benedetto (MF) Estudiantes de Mérida (Venezuela) 21/06/1945
N° 7   Carlos Enrique Marin (MF) Deportivo Italia (Venezuela) 02/06/1950
N° 11  Lorenzo Delman Useche (MF) Deportivo Italia (Venezuela) 21/06/1950
N°  9  Francisco Rodríguez (FW) Deportivo Anzoategui FC (Venezuela) 30/09/1945
N° 13  Iván García (FW) Estudiantes de Mérida (Venezuela) 18/04/1947
N°     Luis Enrique Marquina Perez (DF) Portuguesa FC (Venezuela) 12/11/1952
N°    Reinaldo Rangel (FW) Deportivo Italia (Venezuela)  / /19
N°     Ramón Alfredo Iriarte Navarro (MF) Deportivo Galicia (Venezuela) 12/01/1948
N°     Asdrúbal Olivares (DF) Sociedad Deportivo Centro Italo (Venezuela) 11/02/1953
N°     Richard Paez (MF) Estudiantes de Mérida (Venezuela) 31/12/1952
N°       Jose Ravelo Rodriguez (Spain) (FW) Xerez Club Deportivo (Spain) 08/02/1944
N°      Héctor Rodríguez (MF) La Salle Futbol Club (Venezuela) / /19

Yugoslavia
Head coach:  Vujadin Boškov

References

External links
RSSSF.com - Brazil Independence Cup 1972 - Additional Details
www.ceroacero.es paginas como www.partidosdelaroja.com www.auf.org.uy  www.worldfootball.net www.livefootball.com entre otros sitios webs,relacionados a dicho torneo los 150 años de la Independencia de la Republica Federativa de Brasil en dicho año.
squads
Association football tournament squads
www.ceroacero.es websites what www.partidosdelaroja.com www.worldfootball.net www.livefootball.com among others websites, related to said tournament the 150 years of the independence of the Republica Fedrative from Brazil in that year.
Los jugadores con 1 asterisco ellos ya estan confirmados con dias, meses, años y clubes correspondientes, los futbolistas con 2 asteriscos faltan confirmar sus dias, mes y años respectivamente investigar en las federaciones de futbol o en sus respectivos clubes donde jugaron con anterioridad. Igual que en los torneos internacionales o en sus federaciones de futbol de dichos paises en todos sus torneos sean de selecciones nacionales o equipos.
The players with 1 asterisk they are ready confirmed with days,months, years and clubs corresponding, the football players with 2 asterisks need to confirm his days,month and years respectively investigate in the federations of soccer or in their respective clubs where they played before. The same as in international tournaments or their soccer federations of those countries in all his tournaments are from national teams or teams respectives.